The Victoriana Stakes is a thoroughbred horse race run annually in early to mid August at Woodbine Racetrack in Toronto, Ontario, Canada. An Ontario Sire Stakes, it is a restricted race for fillies and mares, age three and older. Contested over a distance of  miles (8.5 furlongs) on turf, it currently carries a purse of $115,000.

Inaugurated at Fort Erie Racetrack, it was raced there from 1975 through 1977 and again in 1994.

Records
Speed  record: 

Most wins:
 2 - Christy's Mount (1977, 1979)
 2 - Avenare (1980, 1981)
 2 - Eternal Search (1982, 1983)
 2 - Bold Ruritana (1994, 1996)
 2 - Inish Glora (2003, 2004)
 2 - Financingavailable (2006, 2007)
 2 - Impossible Time (2010, 2011)

Most wins by an owner:
 2 - D. H. Bunker (1977, 1979)
 2 - Jim Dandy Stable (1982, 1983)
 2 - Minshall Farms (1994, 1996)
 2 - Robert Costigan (2003, 2004)
 2 - K. K. Sangara (2006, 2007)
 2 - Charles E. Fipke (2010, 2011)

Most wins by a jockey:
 5 - Jim McAleney (1989, 1990, 1999, 2006, 2007)

Most wins by a trainer:
 4 - Macdonald Benson (1990, 2000, 2003, 2004)

Winners of the Victoriana Stakes

References
 The Victoriana Stakes at Pedigree query
 2007 Victoriana Stakes at Woodbine Racetrack
 The 2010 Victoriana Stakes at Woodbine Racetrack

Ontario Sire Stakes
Ungraded stakes races in Canada
Mile category horse races for fillies and mares
Recurring sporting events established in 1975
Woodbine Racetrack
1975 establishments in Ontario